The Church Hill Grammar School, now the Edward J. Creamer Pawtucket School Administration Building, is a historic school building at 81 Park Place in Pawtucket, Rhode Island.  It is a -story structure, finished in brick trimmed with granite.  It is an elegant example of Queen Anne styling, designed by the Providence firm of William R. Walker & Son and built in 1889–90.  It has a cross-gabled slate roof, a prominent bell tower with pyramidal roof, and entrances recessed under shed-roof porches.  The building served as a school until 1946, and then as an administration building until 2006.

The building was listed on the National Register of Historic Places in 2010.

Gallery

See also
National Register of Historic Places listings in Pawtucket, Rhode Island

References

School buildings on the National Register of Historic Places in Rhode Island
Queen Anne architecture in Rhode Island
School buildings completed in 1889
Buildings and structures in Pawtucket, Rhode Island
National Register of Historic Places in Pawtucket, Rhode Island